Masonville may refer to:
Canada
 Masonville, a neighborhood in London, Ontario
 Masonville Place, a shopping mall
United States
 Masonville, Arkansas
 Masonville, Baltimore
 Masonville, Colorado
 Masonville, Iowa
 Masonville, Kentucky
 Masonville, New Jersey
 Masonville, New York
 Masonville Township, Michigan
 North Eastern States serviced by W. B. Mason are known as Masonville.